Miya Khan Chishti's Mosque and Tomb is a medieval mosque and tomb complex on the bank of Sabarmati river in Shahibaug area of Ahmedabad, India.

History and architecture

Miya Khan Chishti's mosque was built in 1465 by Malik Maksud Vazir, brother of Malik Bahauddin, for Miya Khan Chishti, whose family was the holder of office of city judge or Kazi during Gujarat Sultanate rule, This mosque is maintained by Sardar Kazi Nasiruddin Fariduddin Chishty First Non Talukdar Sardar Of Gujarat Currently His Family Is Caring.

The mosque is an example of  Indo-Islamic architecture which blends Hindu and Muslim architectural elements. There are three main domes surrounded by several smaller domes. The facade has ornated entrance and  two minarets with fine stone carvings. Both minarets were damaged in 1819 Rann of Kutch earthquake. The mosque also sustained damage from 2001 Gujarat earthquake.

References 

 This article includes public domain text from

External links
 Model of original mosque on VAM UK

Mosques in Ahmedabad
Religious buildings and structures completed in 1465
Chishti Order
Sufi shrines in India
Dargahs in India